The 2021–22 Detroit Mercy Titans men's basketball team represented the University of Detroit Mercy in the 2021–22 NCAA Division I men's basketball season. The Titans, led by fourth-year head coach Mike Davis, played their home games at Calihan Hall in Detroit, Michigan as members of the Horizon League. They finished the season 14–15, 10–7 in Horizon League play to finish in sixth place. They defeated Green Bay in the first round of the Horizon League Tournament before losing to Northern Kentucky in the quarterfinals. They received an invitation to The Basketball Classic postseason tournament, formerly known as the CollegeInsider.com Tournament where they lost to Florida Gulf Coast in the first round.

Previous season
In a season limited due to the ongoing COVID-19 pandemic, the Titans finished the 2020–21 season 12–10, 10–6 in Horizon League play to finish in third place. They defeated Robert Morris in the first round of the Horizon League tournament, before falling to Northern Kentucky in the quarterfinals.

Roster

Schedule and results

|-
!colspan=12 style=| Regular season

|-
!colspan=9 style=| Horizon League tournament

|-
!colspan=9 style=| The Basketball Classic

Sources

References

Detroit Mercy Titans men's basketball seasons
Detroit Mercy Titans
Detroit Mercy Titans men's basketball
Detroit Mercy Titans men's basketball
Detroit Mercy